COBWEB is an incremental system for hierarchical conceptual clustering. COBWEB was invented by Professor Douglas H. Fisher, currently at Vanderbilt University.

COBWEB incrementally organizes observations into a classification tree. Each node in a classification tree represents a class (concept) and is labeled by a probabilistic concept that summarizes the attribute-value distributions of objects classified under the node. This classification tree can be used to predict missing attributes or the class of a new object.

There are four basic operations COBWEB employs in building the classification tree. Which operation is selected depends on the category utility of the classification achieved by applying it. The operations are:
 Merging Two Nodes  Merging two nodes means replacing them by a node whose children is the union of the original nodes' sets of children and which summarizes the attribute-value distributions of all objects classified under them.
 Splitting a node A node is split by replacing it with its children.
 Inserting a new node A node is created corresponding to the object being inserted into the tree.
 Passing an object down the hierarchy Effectively calling the COBWEB algorithm on the object and the subtree rooted in the node.

The COBWEB Algorithm

   COBWEB(root, record):
   Input: A COBWEB node root, an instance to insert record
   if root has no children then
     children := {copy(root)}
     newcategory(record) \\ adds child with record’s feature values.
     insert(record, root) \\ update root’s statistics
   else
     insert(record, root)
     for child in root’s children do
       calculate Category Utility for insert(record, child),
       set best1, best2 children w. best CU.
     end for
     if newcategory(record) yields best CU then
       newcategory(record)
     else if merge(best1, best2) yields best CU then
       merge(best1, best2)
       COBWEB(root, record)
     else if split(best1) yields best CU then
       split(best1)
       COBWEB(root, record)
     else
       COBWEB(best1, record)
     end if
   end

External links
Working python implementation of COBWEB

References 

Cluster analysis algorithms